Hussein Yussuf El-Alfy (29 March 1927 – 29 January 2011) was an Egyptian rower. He competed in the men's single sculls event at the 1952 Summer Olympics.

References

1927 births
2011 deaths
Egyptian male rowers
Olympic rowers of Egypt
Rowers at the 1952 Summer Olympics
Place of birth missing